The witch, Arnoglossus scapha, is a lefteye flounder of the family Bothidae, found around China and New Zealand, in waters less than 400 m in depth.  Their length is from 20 to 40 cm.

References
 
 Tony Ayling & Geoffrey Cox, Collins Guide to the Sea Fishes of New Zealand,  (William Collins Publishers Ltd, Auckland, New Zealand 1982) 

Scaldfish
Fish described in 1801